The 2020–21 Texas A&M Aggies men's basketball team represented Texas A&M University during the 2020–21 NCAA Division I men's basketball season. The team is led by second-year head coach Buzz Williams, and play their home games at Reed Arena in College Station, Texas as a member of the Southeastern Conference.

Previous season 
The Aggies finished the 2019–20 season 16–14, 10–8 in SEC play to finish in a tie for sixth place. As the No. 7 seed in the SEC tournament, they were set to take on Missouri in the second round before the remainder of the SEC Tournament was canceled due to the ongoing COVID-19 pandemic.

Roster

Schedule and results

|-
!colspan=12 style=|Non-conference regular season

|-
!colspan=12 style=|SEC regular season

|-
!colspan=12 style=|  SEC tournament

Source

References

Texas A&M Aggies men's basketball seasons
Texas AandM Aggies
Texas AandM Aggies men's basketball
Texas AandM Aggies men's basketball